Robert Bruce Walker (6 November 1870 – 1 July 1932) was an Australian politician.

He was born at Windsor to William Walker and Henrietta Medora, née Cooper. After attending Windsor Grammar School and Cooerwull Academy at Bowenfels he worked for the Commercial Banking Company of Sydney until he was articled in his father's legal firm. On 8 June 1895 he married Lucinda Isabel Rowthorn, with whom he had four sons. In 1899 he was admitted as a solicitor and became a partner in his father's firm. He also entered the military, rising to become a major in the Australian Light Horse. In 1917 he was elected to the New South Wales Legislative Assembly as the independent member for Hawkesbury. With the introduction of proportional representation in 1920 Walker, having joined the Nationalists, was elected as one of the members for Cumberland, representing that seat until single-member districts were reintroduced in 1927 and he resumed his old seat of Hawkesbury.

See also

References

 

1870 births
1932 deaths
Independent members of the Parliament of New South Wales
Nationalist Party of Australia members of the Parliament of New South Wales
Members of the New South Wales Legislative Assembly
Australian soldiers
Australian solicitors